Acumatica provides cloud and browser based enterprise resource planning software for small and medium-sized businesses. The company is headquartered in Kirkland, Washington, in the Seattle metropolitan area.

Acumatica has partnerships with BDO USA and Shopify.

History

The Acumatica ERP product was introduced in 2008 followed a year later by on-premises and SaaS versions. 

In 2014, former Microsoft Vice President Jon Roskill became CEO and the xRP cloud platform launched.  

Private-equity fund EQT Partners purchased Acumatica in 2019 and a London office opened in 2021.

Acquisitions

 2020, JAAS Advanced Manufacturing Software from JAAS Systems
 2022, IBS Imperium, a property management application

Funding

 2011, unquantified investment from Visma
 2014, over $13 million led by MYOB
 2018, $25 million Series C funding led by Accel-KKR

Technology

Acumatica's ERP is built with its proprietary web-based xRP platform and can be licensed on-premises / in the cloud, or provided on a SaaS basis.

The SaaS product runs on Amazon Web Services, Azure and SQL Azure. Licensed software runs on Microsoft Windows Server / SQL Server and applications run as .NET managed code.

Recognition

References

External links
 

2008 establishments in Maryland
American companies established in 2008
2019 mergers and acquisitions
Accounting software
Software companies based in Washington (state)
Companies based in Kirkland, Washington
Customer relationship management software companies
ERP software
ERP software companies
Financial software companies
Software companies established in 2008
Software companies of the United States
Private equity portfolio companies